Viva a Brotolândia is the Debut  album by  Brazilian music superstar Elis Regina. The album was released in 1961 by Continental Records.

Track listing
 "Dá Sorte"
 "Sonhando" (Dreamin')
 "Murmúrio"
 "Tu Serás"
 "Samba Feito Pra Mim"
 "Fala-Me De Amor" (Take Me In Your Arms)
 "Baby Face"
 "Dor De Cotovelo"
 "Garoto Último Tipo" (Puppy Love)
 "As Coisas Que Eu Gosto" (My Favorite Things)
 "Mesmo De Mentira"
 "Amor, Amor"... (Love Love)

References

1961 debut albums
Elis Regina albums
Portuguese-language albums
Continental Records albums